The uninhabited Chapman Islands are members of the Canadian Arctic Archipelago in the territory of Nunavut. They are located in the Bathurst Inlet, just south of the Coronation Gulf. They lie south of the Wilmot Islands.

References 

Islands of Bathurst Inlet
Uninhabited islands of Kitikmeot Region